The Aneesur Rahman Prize for Computational Physics is a prize that has been awarded annually by the American Physical Society since 1993. The recipient is chosen for "outstanding achievement in computational physics research". The prize is named after Aneesur Rahman (d. 1987), pioneer of the molecular dynamics simulation method. The prize was valued at $5,000 from 2007 to 2014, and is currently valued at $10,000.

Recipients 

Source: American Physical Society
 2022 Giulia Galli
 2021 Anders W. Sandvik
 2020 Antoine Georges and Gabriel Kotliar
 2019 Sharon C. Glotzer
 2018 
 2017 Sauro Succi
 2016 
 2015 John D. Joannopoulos
 2014 Robert Swendsen
 2013 James R. Chelikowsky
 2012 Kai-Ming Ho
 2011 James M. Stone
 2010 Frans Pretorius
 2009 
 2008 Gary S. Grest
 2007 Daan Frenkel
 2006 David Vanderbilt
 2005 Uzi Landman
 2004 Farid Abraham
 2003 Steven R. White
 2002 David P. Landau
 2001 Alex Zunger
 2000 Michael John Creutz
 1999 Michael L. Klein
 1998 David Matthew Ceperley
 1997 Donald H. Weingarten
 1996 Steven Gwon Sheng Louie
 1995 Roberto Car and Michele Parrinello
 1994 John M. Dawson
 1993 Kenneth G. Wilson

See also
 List of physics awards

References

Awards of the American Physical Society
Computational physics